Bangar is the town of the Bruneian district of Temburong, an isolated territorial exclave separated from the rest of the country by the Malaysian state of Sarawak. The population of the town proper was 626 in 2016.

Geography
One main road runs through the town, roughly east–west. Headed east of Bangar is Lawas, Sarawak (Malaysia) and to the west is the river crossing to Limbang, Sarawak (Malaysia). The road is the major route to the local quarry where boulders are collected, processed and shipped to stockyards in the capital, Bandar Seri Begawan, for construction companies.

Administration 
Bangar is an unincorporated town; it has no municipal body. It is only a village subdivision within Mukim Bangar, a mukim in the district. It has the postcode PA1151.

Climate
Bangar has a tropical rainforest climate (Af) with heavy to very heavy rainfall year-round.

References

External links
 
 

Populated places in Brunei
Temburong District
Villages in Temburong District